Svetlana Viktorovna Sokolova (born 9 January 1981 in Baku, Azerbaijan) is a retired athlete who competed internationally for Russia in the combined events. She represented her country in the heptathlon at the 2004 Summer Olympics in Athens finishing tenth. She also won the silver medal at the 2001 Summer Universiade and was fifth at the 2002 European Championships.

International competitions

Personal bests

Outdoor
200 metres – 24.02 (+0.6 m/s) (Tula 2004)
800 metres – 2:07.23 (Tula 2004)
100 metres hurdles – 13.56 (+1.1 m/s) (Tula 2004)
High jump – 1.82 (Tula 2004)
Long jump – 6.26 (+0.3 m/s) (Tula 2004)
Shot put – 15.09 (Tula 2004)
Javelin throw – 47.86 (Athens 2004)
Heptathlon – 6591 (Tula 2004)

Indoor
800 metres – 2:18.75 (Moscow 2006)
60 metres hurdles – 8.48 (Moscow 2006)
High jump – 1.73 (Moscow 2006)
Long jump – 6.36 (Moscow 2001)
Shot put – 14.31 (Moscow 2006)
Pentathlon – 4442 (Moscow 2006)

References

1981 births
Living people
Sportspeople from Baku
Russian heptathletes
Olympic heptathletes
Olympic athletes of Russia
Athletes (track and field) at the 2004 Summer Olympics
Universiade medalists in athletics (track and field)
Universiade silver medalists for Russia
Medalists at the 2001 Summer Universiade
World Athletics Championships athletes for Russia
Russian Athletics Championships winners